The 2011–12 Santos Laguna season was the 65th professional season of Mexico's top-flight football league. The season is split into two tournaments—the Torneo Apertura and the Torneo Clausura—each with identical formats and each contested by the same eighteen teams. Santos Laguna began their season on July 23, 2011 against Pachuca, Santos Laguna play their homes games on Saturdays at 7:00pm local time.

Torneo Apertura

Squad

Out on loan

Regular season

Apertura 2011 results

Final phase

Santos Laguna advanced 4–3 on aggregate

4–4 on aggregate, Santos Laguna advanced due to being the higher seed in the classification phase

UANL won 4–1 on aggregate

Goalscorers

Results

Results summary

Results by round

Transfers

In

Out

Torneo Clausura

Squad

Out on loan

Regular season

Clausura 2012 results

Final phase

Santos Laguna advanced 6–4 on aggregate

Santos Laguna advanced 3–3 on aggregate due to being the higher seed in the classification phase

Santos Laguna won 3–2 on aggregate

Santos Laguna won their fourth league title in historyGoalscorers

Regular season

Source:

Final phase

Results

Results summary

Results by round

CONCACAF Champions League

 Preliminary round Santos Laguna won 4–3 on aggregate. Group standings 

 Group Stage results 

 Quarter-finals Santos Laguna won 7–3 on aggregate.Semifinals

 Final Monterrey won 3–2 on aggregate''

Goalscorers

Notes

References

2011–12 Primera División de México season
Mexican football clubs 2011–12 season
2011-12